This page provides maps and a list of cities and towns during the Syrian civil war.


Maps

List
Syria is subdivided in a hierarchical manner into 14 Governorates (or G.) and 65 Districts. For each governorate, the first city in the table is the governorate capital (and capital city of its district at the same time). The following towns are the regional capitals (administrative centers) of the districts. The last item is the rural area outside the listed towns in each governorate. Each section details a brief summary of that city or town's history during the Syrian Civil War. The population figures are given according to the 2004 official census.

Aleppo Governorate

Damascus and Rif Damashq Governorates

Daraa Governorate

Deir ez-Zor Governorate

Hama Governorate

al-Hasakah Governorate

Homs Governorate

Idlib Governorate

Latakia Governorate

Quneitra Governorate

Raqqa Governorate

as-Suwayda Governorate

Tartus Governorate

See also

 List of airports in Syria
 Spillover of the Syrian Civil War

References

Syrian civil war